Anisoneura is a genus of moths of the family Erebidae.

Species
The species include:
 Anisoneura aluco (Fabricius, 1775)
 Anisoneura hypocyana  Guenée, 1852
 Anisoneura papuana  Hampson, 1913 
 Anisoneura sphingoides (C.Felder, 1861)
 Anisoneura salebrosa Guenée, 1852
 Anisoneura zeuzeroides  Guenée, 1852

References
Zilli A. & de Vos, R., 2019. Cryptic diversity within the Anisoneura aluco-group (Lepidoptera: Erebidae). Fragmenta entomologica, 51 (1): 17-26 (2019).Anisoneura at Markku Savela's Lepidoptera and Some Other Life Forms
 Natural History Museum Lepidoptera genus database

Catocalinae
Noctuoidea genera